Marie Prouvensier (born 9 February 1994) is a French handball player for OGC Nice Côte d'Azur Handball and the French national team.

Individual awards
French Championship Best Right Wing: 2015

References

1994 births
Living people
French female handball players